Venus Xtravaganza (May 22, 1965 – December 21, 1988) was an American transgender performer. She came to national attention after her appearance in Jennie Livingston's 1990 documentary film Paris Is Burning, in which her life as a trans woman forms one of the film's several story arcs.

Early life 
Xtravaganza was born on May 22, 1965, in Jersey City, New Jersey. Her parents were of Italian-American and Puerto Rican descent. She had four brothers. Xtravaganza took the name Venus in her early teens.

Career 
Xtravaganza states in Paris Is Burning that she began cross-dressing and performing at age 13 or 14, placing her earliest performances around 1978 or 1979. Eventually, her family caught on to her lifestyle, and because she did not "want to embarrass them, ... [she] moved away." She relocated to New York City in order to be able to perform freely. Her ball career began in 1983, when House of Xtravaganza founder Hector Valle invited her to join the house. She stated that he "was the first gay man I ever met."

On her 15th birthday, Valle took her to Greenwich Village, threw her a party, and bought her a cake. After Valle died from AIDS-related complications in 1985, Angie Xtravaganza assumed the role of house mother, and she took on Venus Xtravaganza as her mentee and drag daughter. At the time of filming Paris Is Burning, Xtravaganza was an aspiring model. She said, "I [want] my sex change to make myself feel complete."

Death 
On Christmas Day in 1988, Xtravaganza was found strangled under a bed at the Duchess Hotel in New York. It was estimated that her body had been there for four days upon discovery. Shooting for Paris Is Burning was ongoing, and the film's final minutes include Angie Xtravaganza reacting to her death. Angie Xtravaganza said she felt that Venus was one to take too many chances, that she "was too wild with people in the streets", and that she feared "something [was] going to happen to [her]." Angie Xtravaganza was the first person detectives approached with the news of Xtravaganza's death, and it was she who broke the news to the latter's biological parents.

In Paris Is Burning, Xtravaganza describes a time she narrowly escaped an attack by a man who discovered she was transgender during an intimate encounter, and it is possible her murder occurred during a similar situation. Her killer was never found. She is buried at Holy Cross Cemetery in North Arlington, New Jersey.

Legacy 
 In her book Bodies That Matter: On the Discursive Limits of "Sex", feminist scholar Judith Butler discusses Xtravaganza's interviews in the context of transgender identity and gender theory.
 In the fall of 2013, a New York City theatre group presented a murder mystery play centered around a fictionalized account of Xtravaganza's murder. Members of the House of Xtravanganza stated in a press release on Facebook that they were not involved in the show's production and withheld their endorsement. In a later press release, they condemned the work as "inappropriate, opportunistic, and disrespectful to Venus' legacy." Xtravaganza's biological family also expressed displeasure with the play.
 In the reality television competition program RuPaul's Drag Race, contestants and judges frequently allude to lines from Paris Is Burning, many of them Xtravaganza's. A notable example occurs in the second episode of the fourth season, when competitor Willam Belli refers to the opposing team in a challenge as "a bunch of overgrown orangutans", a read (insult) Xtravaganza used in the documentary.
 The House of Xtravaganza remains active in the ball circuit, nightlife, and LGBTQ activism. It is one of the oldest active houses in New York City.
 In the documentary film How Do I Look, an award in her name was given to Jazmine Givenchy. The text of the award reads: "THE VENUS XTRAVAGANZA LEGENDS AWARD Presented To JAZMINE GIVENCHY Celebrating Black History And Culture Through The Rich Traditions Of The BALLROOM/HOUSE COMMUNITY". February 20, 2004.

See also 
 LGBT culture in New York City
 List of LGBT people from New York City
 List of solved missing person cases
 List of people killed for being transgender
 List of unsolved murders

References

External links 
 

1965 births
1980s missing person cases
1988 deaths
1988 murders in the United States
American murder victims
American people of Italian descent
Deaths by strangulation in the United States
Female murder victims
Formerly missing people
House of Xtravaganza
Incidents of violence against women
American LGBT entertainers
LGBT Hispanic and Latino American people
LGBT people from New Jersey
LGBT people from New York (state)
American people of Puerto Rican descent
Missing person cases in New York City
Sex workers murdered in the United States
People from Jersey City, New Jersey
People murdered in New York City
Transgender entertainers
Transgender women
Unsolved murders in the United States
Violence against trans women
Violence against LGBT people in the United States
20th-century American LGBT people
History of women in New York City
Women in New York City